Manny Hazard (born 1969) is a former professional American football wide receiver who played collegiately at the University of Houston and in the CFL for the Toronto Argonauts.

Hazard, who played with Heisman Trophy winner quarterback Andre Ware at Houston in 1989, held the NCAA football record for most receptions in a season with 142 until December 30, 2009, when Bowling Green's Freddie Barnes broke the record in the first quarter of the 2009 Humanitarian Bowl.

Hazard went undrafted in the 1991 NFL Draft.

See also
List of NCAA football records
 List of NCAA major college football yearly receiving leaders

References

Houston Cougars football players
Toronto Argonauts players
American players of Canadian football
American football wide receivers
Canadian football wide receivers
Living people
1969 births